Shruti Marathe  (born 9 October 1986) is an Indian actress known for her works in Hindi, Marathi and  Tamil films and television.

Personal life 
Shruti married actor Gaurav Ghatnekar in 2016.

Career 
She made her film debut with the Marathi film Sanai Choughade (2008) and the Tamil film Indira Vizha (2009). Her other works include films such as Naan Avanillai 2 (2009), Guru Sishyan (2010), Rama Madhav (2014), Taptapadi (2014), Bandh Nylon Che (2016), and Budhia Singh – Born to Run (2016). Regarding her role in Rama Madhav, a critic stated that "as Parvatibai, Shruti Marathe brings out the perfect pathos as a woman waiting for her dead husband to return from war". In a review of Budhia Singh – Born to Run, a critic noted that "But the surprise package is Shruti Marathe as Biranchi's wife Gita. She holds her stead against Manoj with fair gusto. She smoothly conveys the poignant turmoil of a wife and mother". She made her Kannada film debut with Aadu Aata Aadu, a remake of Thiruttu Payale (2006).

Filmography

Films

Television

Theatre 

 Sant Sakhu
 Lagnabambal

References

External links
 

Indian film actresses
Living people
Actresses from Pune
Marathi people
Actresses in Tamil cinema
Female models from Maharashtra
1986 births
21st-century Indian actresses
Actresses in Marathi cinema
Actresses in Kannada cinema
Actresses in Marathi television